IZO is a 2004 Japanese film directed by Takashi Miike. The main character of the film is Izo Okada (1832–1865), the historical samurai and assassin in 19th-century Japan who was tortured and executed by beheading in Tosa.

Izo appeared previously in Hideo Gosha's Hitokiri (1969), then played by Shintaro Katsu. However, Miike's portrayal of the character (or rather his spirit) transcends reality (and time and space) and is more of a surrealist exposé of Izo's exceedingly bloody yet philosophical encounters in an afterlife heavy on symbolism, occasionally interrupted by stock footage of World War II accompanied by acid-folk singer Kazuki Tomokawa on guitar. Kazuya Nakayama plays Izo and the many characters he encounters on his journey include figures played by Takeshi Kitano and Bob Sapp.

Cast 
 Kazuya Nakayama - Okada Izo
 Kaori Momoi - 	
 Ryuhei Matsuda - 
 Ryôsuke Miki - Hampeita Takechi		
 Yuya Uchida - Spirit	
 Masumi Okada - Politician
 Hiroki Matsukata - 
 Hiroshi Katsuno - Samurai
 Masato - Samurai
 Bob Sapp - Monk
 Takeshi Caesar - Samurai
 Takeshi Kitano - The Prime Minister
 Daijiro Harada - Judge
 Renji Ishibashi - Samurai
 Mickey Curtis - Monk
 Kazuki Tomokawa - 
 Taisaku Akino
 Hiroyuki Nagato - Elder
 Susumu Terajima - 
 Saburō Shinoda
 Ken Ogata - 
 Joe Yamanaka -

Awards
Izo was awarded the best Special Effects prize at the Sitges Film Festival (Spanish international festival specializing in fantasy and horror films).

External links
 
 
Reviews
dinaMiike – review and interpretation
Cultflicks – review
d+kaz
Midnight Eye
Martin Tsai (reprinted from WestEnder)
Nippon Cinema 
See also

References

2004 films
2004 action films
2004 fantasy films
Films directed by Takashi Miike
Films set in the 19th century
2000s Japanese-language films
Japanese action films
Samurai films
2000s Japanese films